Grégory Dufer (born 19 December 1981) is a retired Belgian international footballer.

Honours
Club Brugge
Belgian Super Cup: 2005

 Standard Liège
 Belgian Super Cup: 2009

References

External links
 
 
 
 

1981 births
Living people
Belgian footballers
Belgium international footballers
Belgium youth international footballers
Belgium under-21 international footballers
R. Charleroi S.C. players
Ligue 1 players
Stade Malherbe Caen players
K.S.C. Lokeren Oost-Vlaanderen players
Club Brugge KV players
A.F.C. Tubize players
Standard Liège players
Sint-Truidense V.V. players
Royal Antwerp F.C. players
RFC Liège players
Belgian Pro League players
Belgian expatriate footballers
Expatriate footballers in France
Challenger Pro League players
Sportspeople from Charleroi
Footballers from Hainaut (province)
Association football midfielders